Nnadozie Ugonna Ezenwaka (born June 16, 1994) is a Nigerian footballer.

References

External links
 
 

1994 births
Living people
Nigerian footballers
Maccabi Netanya F.C. players
Association football midfielders